The following are the winners of the 17th annual (1990) Origins Award, presented at Origins 1991:

External links
 1990 Origins Awards Winners

1990 awards
1990 awards in the United States
Origins Award winners